An astronomical survey is a general map or image of a region of the sky (or of the whole sky) that lacks a specific observational target.  Alternatively, an astronomical survey may comprise a set of images, spectra, or other observations of objects that share a common type or feature. Surveys are often restricted to one band of the electromagnetic spectrum due to instrumental limitations, although multiwavelength surveys can be made by using multiple detectors, each sensitive to a different bandwidth.

Surveys have generally been performed as part of the production of an astronomical catalog. They may also search for transient astronomical events. They often use wide-field astrographs.

Scientific value 
Sky surveys, unlike targeted observation of a specific object, allow astronomers to catalog celestial objects and perform statistical analyses on them without complex corrections for selection effects.  In some cases, an astronomer interested in a particular object will find that survey images are sufficient to make new telescope time entirely unnecessary.

Surveys also help astronomers choose targets for closer study using larger, more powerful telescopes. If previous observations support a hypothesis, a telescope scheduling committee is more likely to approve new, more detailed observations to test it.

The wide scope of surveys makes them ideal for finding foreground objects that move, such as asteroids and comets. An astronomer can compare existing survey images to current observations to identify changes; this task can even be performed automatically using image analysis software. Besides science, these surveys also detect potentially hazardous objects. Similarly, images of the same object taken by different surveys can be compared to detect transient astronomical events such as variable stars.

List of sky surveys 

 Optical
Hipparchus - created the first known star catalogue with more than 850 stars.  The data was incorporated into the Almagest along with the first list of stellar magnitudes and was the primary astronomical reference until modern times, 190-120 BC.
Bonner Durchmusterung - whole-sky astrometric star catalog, 1859-1903
Astrographic Catalogue - international astronomical survey of the entire sky. The survey was performed by  18 observatories using over 22,000 photographic plates. The results have been the basis of comparison for all subsequent surveys, 1887-1975.
Henry Draper Catalogue - spectral classifications based on photographic plates, 1918-1924, extension 1925-1936
Catalina Sky Survey - an astronomical survey to discover comets and asteroids.
 Pan-Andromeda Archaeological Survey
 National Geographic Society – Palomar Observatory Sky Survey (NGS–POSS) – survey of the northern sky on photographic plates, 1948–1958
 CfA Redshift Survey –  A program from Harvard-Smithsonian Center for Astrophysics.  It began in 1977 to 1982 then from 1985 to 1995.
 Digitized Sky Survey – optical all-sky survey created from digitized photographic plates, 1994
 2dF Galaxy Redshift Survey (2dfGRS) – redshift survey conducted by the Anglo-Australian Observatory between 1997 and 2002
 Sloan Digital Sky Survey (SDSS) – an optical and spectroscopic survey, 2000–2006 (first pass)
 Photopic Sky Survey – a survey with 37,440 individual exposures, 2010–2011.
 DEEP2 Redshift Survey (DEEP2) – Used Keck Telescopes to measure redshift of 50,000 galaxies
 VIMOS-VLT Deep Survey (VVDS) – Franco-Italian study using the Very Large Telescope at Paranal Observatory
 Palomar Distant Solar System Survey (PDSSS)
 WiggleZ Dark Energy Survey (2006–2011) used the Australian Astronomical Observatory
 Dark Energy Survey (DES) is a survey about one-tenth of the sky to find clues to the characteristics of dark energy.-
 Calar Alto Legacy Integral Field Area Survey (CALIFA) – a spectroscopic survey of galaxies
 SAGES Legacy Unifying Globulars and GalaxieS (SAGES Legacy Unifying Globulars and GalaxieS Survey (SLUGGS) survey – a near-infrared spectro-photometric survey of 25 nearby early-type galaxies (2014)
 Large Sky Area Multi-Object Fiber Spectroscopic Telescope (LAMOST) – an extra-galactic and stellar spectroscopic survey
 IPHAS and VPHAS+ – surveys of the Galactic bulge and inner disk using the Isaac Newton Telescope (north) and VLT Survey Telescope (south) in u, g, r, Hα, and i bands, 2003–present
 Pan-STARRS – a large-field survey system to look for transient and variable sources. 2010-present
 Optical Gravitational Lensing Experiment (OGLE) – large-scale variability sky survey (in I and V bands), 1992–present
 DESI Legacy Imaging Surveys (Legacy Surveys) - large imaging survey of the extragalactic sky, in three bands and covering one third of the sky, 2013–present
 GSNST - Global Supernovae Search Team - an all sky survey launched in August 2018 to look for Astronomical Transients 
 Gaia catalogues of over a billion parallax distances 
 Infrared 
 Infrared Astronomical Satellite did an all sky survey at 12, 25, 60, and 100 μm, 1983
 The 2-micron All-Sky Survey (2MASS), a ground-based all sky survey at J, H, and Ks bands (1.25, 1.65, and 2.17 μm) 1997–2001
 Akari (Astro-F) a Japanese mid and far infrared all-sky survey satellite, 2006–2008
 Wide-field Infrared Survey Explorer (WISE) was launched in December 2009 to begin a survey of 99% of the sky at wavelengths of 3.3, 4.7, 12, and 23 μm.  The telescope is over a thousand times as sensitive as previous infrared surveys.  The initial survey, consisting of each sky position imaged at least eight times, was completed by July 2010.
 UKIRT Infrared Deep Sky Survey (UKIDSS) – a collection of ground based northern hemisphere surveys (GPS, GCS, LAS, DXS, UDS) using the WFCAM camera on UKIRT, some wide and some very deep, in Z, Y, J, H, & K bands 2005–
 VISTA public surveys – a collection of ground based southern hemisphere surveys (VVV, VMC, VHS, VIKING, VIDEO, UltraVISTA), of various areas and depths, in Z, Y, J, H, & Ks bands, 2009–present
 SCUBA-2 All Sky Survey

 Radio
 Third Cambridge Catalogue of Radio Sources ("3C") - Survey at 159 and 178 MHz published in 1959
HIPASS – Radio survey, the first blind HI survey to cover the entire southern sky.   1997–2002
 Ohio Sky Survey – Over 19,000 radio sources at 1415 MHz. 1965–1973.
 NVSS – Survey at 1.4 GHz mapping the sky north of −40 deg
 FIRST – Survey to look for faint radio sources at twenty cms.
 SUMSS - Survey at 843 MHz, mapping the sky south of -30 deg with similar sensitivity and resolution to the northern NVSS 
 PALFA Survey – On-going 1.4 GHz survey for radio pulsars using the Arecibo Observatory.
 GALEX Arecibo SDSS Survey GASS designed to measure the neutral hydrogen content of a representative sample of ~1000 massive, galaxies
 C-BASS – On-going 5 GHz all sky survey to aid in the subtraction of galactic foregrounds from maps of the Cosmic Microwave Background
 EMU – A large radio continuum survey covering 3/4 of the sky, expected to discover about 70 million galaxies 
 GMRT - The Giant Metrewave Radio Telescope's TGSS ADR  mapped the sky at 150 MHz.
HTRU – A pulsar and radio transients survey of the northern and southern sky using the Parkes Radio Telescope and the Effelsberg telescope.
 Gamma-ray
 Fermi Gamma-ray Space Telescope, formerly referred to as the "Gamma-ray Large Area Space Telescope (GLAST)." 2008–present; the goal for the telescope's lifetime is 10 years.
 Multi-wavelength surveys
 GAMA – the Galaxy And Mass Assembly survey combines data from a number of ground- and space-based observatories together with a large redshift survey, performed at the Anglo-Australian Telescope.  The resulting dataset aims to be a comprehensive resource for studying the physics of the galaxy population and underlying mass structures in the recent universe.
 GOODS – The Great Observatories Origins Deep Survey.
 COSMOS – The Cosmic Evolution Survey
 CANDELS - The Cosmic Assembly Near-infrared Deep Extragalactic Legacy Survey
 (The latter three surveys are joining together observations obtained from space with the Hubble Space Telescope, the Spitzer Space Telescope, the Chandra X-ray Observatory and the XMM-Newton satellite, with a large set of observations obtained with ground-based telescopes).
 Atlas 3d Survey – sample of 260 galaxies for the Astrophysics project.
 Planned
 Vera C. Rubin Observatory – a proposed very large telescope designed to repeatedly survey the whole sky that is visible from its location
 Widefield ASKAP L-Band Legacy All-Sky Blind Survey (WALLABY)

Surveys of the Magellanic Clouds 
 Catalogues of H-α emission stars and nebulae in the Magellanic Clouds - published 1956 (Astrophys. J. Suppl., 2, 315)
 MCELS (Magellanic Cloud Emission-line Survey)
 The Magellanic Clouds Photometric Survey – UBVI (optical)
 Deep Near Infrared Survey (DENIS) – near-IR

See also 

 See astronomical catalogue for a more detailed description of astronomical surveys and the production of astronomical catalogues
 Redshift surveys are astronomical surveys devoted to mapping the cosmos in three dimensions
 :Category:astronomical catalogues—List of astronomical catalogues on Wikipedia
 Astrograph for a type of instrument used in Astronomical surveys.
 Timeline of astronomical maps, catalogs, and surveys

References 

 
Astronomical imaging
Observational astronomy
 Survey